Cloniocerus kraussii is a species of beetle in the family Cerambycidae. It was described by White in 1855. It is known from Mozambique, Angola, Madagascar, Zambia, and South Africa.

References

Lamiinae
Beetles described in 1855